U.S. Route 33 (US 33) is a United States Numbered Highway running from near Elkhart, Indiana, to Richmond, Virginia. Within the state of Ohio, it is a predominantly southeast–northwest highway running from west of Willshire before crossing over into West Virginia via the Ravenswood Bridge over the Ohio River. The route runs through largely rural territory throughout most of the state's west-central, central, and southeastern regions, although it also passes through large portions of downtown Columbus.

Route description

US 33 enters Ohio from Indiana, to the west, near Willshire in Van Wert County as a two-lane highway, continuing southeast through Mercer County, crossing US 127, then entering Auglaize County, joining limited-access Ohio Route 29 (SR 29) briefly near St. Marys, continuing east as a four-lane parkway, then a controlled-access highway near Wapakoneta, where it intersects Interstate 75 (I-75).

East of I-75, the road once again becomes two-lane as it continues to Lakeview and Russells Point south of Indian Lake.  At the terminus of SR 117 near Huntsville, US 33 becomes a limited-access, multi-lane highway before reaching US 68 at Bellefontaine where it resumes as a controlled-access freeway, passing Campbell Hill, the highest point in Ohio, and continuing around Marysville. Entering Franklin County, the road runs concurrently with SR 161, then intersects I-270 in Dublin.

After I-270, the route loses its controlled-access status and passes through the Dublin Historic District and crosses the Scioto River. The overlap with SR 161 then ends, and US 33 heads south on Riverside Drive towards downtown Columbus, following the Scioto River along the western border of Upper Arlington, where it passes Griggs Reservoir, one of the main sources of water for Columbus. The road changes names two times in this area, first to Dublin Road at the intersection with Trabue Road, and then to Spring/Long Streets at SR 315. The route continues south on 3rd/4th Streets and then east on Livingston Avenue, heading towards the Columbus neighborhood of Driving Park.

In Bexley, US 33 veers southeast onto College Avenue, then intersects I-70. After Petzinger Road, the route becomes a controlled-access highway, subsequently intersecting SR 104, I-270 (for the second time), and SR 317 (Hamilton Road). Following the Ebright Road near Blacklick Estates, the highway continues to the southeast as a non-limited-access expressway.

Beginning at Carroll, US 33 bypasses Lancaster as a limited-access freeway completed in 2005. Continuing southeast, the highway enters Ohio's scenic Hocking Hills region near Sugar Grove as an expressway. As the route approaches Nelsonville, traffic continues on the  limited access four-lane bypass that opened October 1, 2013. South of Athens, US 33 continues as a limited-access highway, bypassing Pomeroy, intersecting SR 124 and SR 7, and continuing to the Ohio River in Meigs County, crossing the Ohio on the two-lane cantilever Ravenswood Bridge, and entering West Virginia in Ravenswood.

History

The Ravenswood Bridge was built in 1981 and originally carried the designation SR 824 until 2003, when US 33 was rerouted on a new bypass out of Pomeroy and connecting to the bridge, supplanting SR 824 in the process.

In 2013, an expressway bypass was completed around Nelsonville. This was done to reduce traffic congestion in the area, as the original routing through Nelsonville was only two lanes wide.

, the route had an average of 73,000 vehicles per day.

Major intersections

See also

References

External links

33
 
Transportation in Van Wert County, Ohio
Transportation in Mercer County, Ohio
Transportation in Auglaize County, Ohio
Transportation in Logan County, Ohio
Transportation in Union County, Ohio
Transportation in Franklin County, Ohio
Transportation in Fairfield County, Ohio
Transportation in Hocking County, Ohio
Transportation in Athens County, Ohio
Transportation in Meigs County, Ohio